Christianity not Mysterious is a 1696 book by the radical thinker John Toland.

Publication history
The work was published anonymously between December 1695 and June 1696. Toland admitted his authorship in June 1696.

Influence
Christianity not Mysterious is a seminal work in both freethought and Irish philosophy. It is seen as a classic expression of deism.

References

Bibliography
Books

External links
 Christianity not Mysterious at Internet Archive

1696 books
Books by John Toland
English-language books
Philosophy of religion